Alan Thompson William Monkhouse (1930–1992), was an English footballer who played as a forward in the Football League.

Club career
Monkhouse's first club was Thornaby. From 1949 to 1953, he played for Millwall, where he scored 20 goals in 65 appearances. He then played for Newcastle United, costing £11,500. He made his debut for the Magpies in a 4–0 home win over Cardiff City. Although regarded as strong and powerful, he could not displace the more famous names in his position, such as Vic Keeble and Jackie Milburn. He scored 9 goals in 21 appearances, and was sold to York City for £4,000. He stayed at York for a season, until he moved on to play for South Shields in the semi-professional North Eastern League. He became known as a penalty kick specialist and was quoted as one of the most consistent spot kickers in the North-East.

Monkhouse died in 1992.

References

External links

1930 births
1992 deaths
English footballers
Footballers from Stockton-on-Tees
Footballers from County Durham
Association football forwards
Newcastle United F.C. players
South Shields F.C. (1936) players
Millwall F.C. players
York City F.C. players
English Football League players